David Meineke (18 October 1929 – 1 February 2010) was a South African rower. He competed in the men's single sculls event at the 1960 Summer Olympics.

References

1929 births
2010 deaths
South African male rowers
Olympic rowers of South Africa
Rowers at the 1960 Summer Olympics